Master of Life and Death (German: Herr über Leben und Tod) is a 1955 West German drama film directed by Victor Vicas and starring Maria Schell, Ivan Desny and Wilhelm Borchert. It was shot at the Spandau Studios in West Berlin and on location around the city and in Brittany. The film's sets were designed by the art directors Hans Ledersteger and Ernst Richter. It is based on the 1938 novel of the same title by Carl Zuckmayer.

Synopsis
Barbara is married to the distinguished professor of medicine Georg Bertram who once saved her father's life. When they have a mentally handicapped child together his clinical coldness comes to the fore and he wants to commit euthanasia on the child. She stops him and takes the child away to Brittany in the hope that a change of location and nursing will help them to improve. While there she encounters a much more sympathetic doctor.

Cast
 Maria Schell as Barbara Bertram, geb. Hansen
 Ivan Desny as Dr. Daniel Karentis
 Wilhelm Borchert as 	Professor Georg Bertram
 Olga Limburg as 	Anna Bertram
 Walter Bluhm as 	Werner Hansen
 Fritz Tillmann as Dr. Peter
 Reinhold Bernt as Bahnwärter
 Harry Giese as Professor Reichert
 Héléna Manson as Louise Kerbrec
 Daniel Mendaille as Monsieur Kerbrec

References

Bibliography
 Bock, Hans-Michael & Bergfelder, Tim. The Concise CineGraph. Encyclopedia of German Cinema. Berghahn Books, 2009.
 Goble, Alan. The Complete Index to Literary Sources in Film. Walter de Gruyter, 1999.

External links 
 

1955 films
1955 drama films
German drama films
West German films
1950s German-language films
Films directed by Victor Vicas
1950s German films
Films shot at Spandau Studios
Films shot in France
Films shot in Berlin
Films set in Brittany
Gloria Film films
Films based on German novels

de:Herr über Leben und Tod (1955)